This is a list of treaties to which the United States has been a party or which have had direct relevance to U.S. history.

Pre-Revolutionary War treaties

Before the United States Declaration of Independence in 1776, the sovereign of the United Kingdom and the leaders of various North American colonies negotiated treaties that affected the territory of what would later become the United States.
 1638 – Treaty of Hartford (1638)
 1646 – Treaty of 1646
 1677 – Treaty of 1677
 1701 – Nanfan Treaty
 1722 – Great Treaty of 1722
 1726 – Deed in Trust from Three of the Five Nations of Indians to the Chancellor
 1744 – Treaty of Lancaster
 1752 – Treaty of Logstown
 1754 – Treaty of Albany
 1758 – Treaty of Easton
 1760 – Treaty of Pittsburgh
 1763 – Treaty of Paris
 1768 – Treaty of Hard Labour
 1768 – Treaty of Fort Stanwix
 1770 – Treaty of Lochaber
 1774 – Treaty of Camp Charlotte

U.S. international treaties
These are treaties that the United States has made with other sovereign international states. This is mostly to distinguish them from the next category. Under the treaty clause of the United States Constitution, treaties come into effect upon final ratification by the President of the United States, provided that a two-thirds majority of the United States Senate concurs.

1776–1799
 1776 – Model Treaty passed by the Continental Congress becomes the template for its future international treaties
1776 – Treaty of Watertown – a military treaty between the newly formed United States and the St. John's and Mi'kmaq First Nations of Nova Scotia, two peoples of the Wabanaki Confederacy. 
 1778 – Treaty of Alliance – American Revolutionary War alliance with the Kingdom of France
 1778 – Treaty of Amity and Commerce (United States – France) 
 1782 – Treaty of Amity and Commerce – with Dutch Republic
 1783 – Treaty of Amity and Commerce (United States – Sweden) – with Sweden
 1783 – Second Treaty of Paris Ended the American Revolutionary War
 1785 – Treaty of Amity and Commerce (Prussia–United States) – with Prussia
 1786 – Moroccan–American Treaty of Friendship – Morocco — first sovereign state to recognize the U.S in 1777, formalized in treaty signed in 1786; oldest unbroken U.S. treaty
 – trade treaty with Spain (not ratified)
 1794 – Treaty of Canandaigua – AKA Pickering Treaty, negotiated by Pickering for George Washington with Red Jacket, Cornplanter, Handsome Lake, and fifty other Iroquois leaders by which they were forced to cede much of their land to the United States. Britain had ceded all its claims to land in the colonies without consulting the Iroquois or other Native American allies.
 1794 – Jay Treaty AKA Treaty of London – attempts to settle post-Revolution disputes with Great Britain. Provided the British Army to evacuate the Northwest Territory and to provide most favoured nation status between Britain and America in exchange for international arbitration of the U.S.-Canada border and wartime debts. Opposed by Jeffersonian Republicans. 
 1795 – Treaty of Greenville – Ended the Northwest Indian War and opened most of Ohio to white settlement
 1795 – Treaty with Algeria
 1795 – Pinckney's Treaty AKA Treaty of Madrid, Treaty of San Lorenzo – defines boundaries of U.S. with Spanish colonies
 1796 – Treaty with Tripoli – tribute payments to Tripoli to protect Americans from seizure and ransom
 1797 – Treaty with Tunis – increases tribute payments to Tripoli

1800–1849
 1800 – Convention of 1800 (Treaty of Mortefontaine) – Ends the Quasi War between France and the U.S.
 1803 – Louisiana Purchase Treaty – Acquire Louisiana Territory from the French First Republic.
 1805 – Treaty with Tripoli – Secured release of Americans being held in Tripoli, proclaimed peace and amity, and ended the First Barbary War.
 1814 – Treaty of Ghent – Ends the War of 1812 between the U.S. and Great Britain, returning the two countries to the status quo ante bellum. 
 1815 – Commercial treaty with Great Britain – Established free trade between the United States, England, and much of the British Empire (Ireland was among the areas excluded)
 1817 – Rush–Bagot Treaty – The United States and Great Britain agree to demilitarize the Great Lakes.
 1818 – Treaty of 1818 – resolved boundary issues between U.S. and Great Britain and demilitarized the border. 
 1819 – Adams–Onís Treaty – purchase of Florida from the Spanish Empire and established the border with New Spain. 
 1824 – Russo-American Treaty – gave Russian claims on land off the Northwest Pacific coast of North America (north of the Oregon Country)
 1824 – Anderson–Gual Treaty – between U.S. and Gran Colombia; first bilateral treaty with another American country
 1828 – Treaty of Limits – between Mexico and the U.S.; confirms the boundary agreed to with Spain in the Adams–Onís Treaty.
 1830 – Treaty with the Ottoman Port Also see Capitulations of the Ottoman Empire
 1831 – Franco-American Treaty of 1831 – France agreed to pay reparations of 25 million francs for damage to American shipping during the Napoleonic Wars (ratified in 1835 under Victor de Broglie's government – see July Monarchy)
 1833 – Siamese–American Treaty of Amity and Commerce – a commercial treaty between the Kingdom of Siam and the United States, first treaty with an East Asian nation
 1833 – Treaty with Muscat
 1835 - Treaty of New Echota – between U.S. government officials and representatives of a minority Cherokee political faction, the Treaty Party
 1842 – Webster–Ashburton Treaty – ended the Aroostook War and settles boundary disputes between the U.S. and Canada
 1844 – Treaty of Wanghia – between China and the U.S.; established five U.S. treaty ports in China with extraterritoriality
 1846 – Mallarino–Bidlack Treaty with the Republic of New Granada (Colombia)
 1846 – Oregon Treaty – brought an end to the Oregon boundary dispute by settling competing American and British claims to the Oregon Country
 1847 – Treaty of Cahuenga – ends the Mexican–American War in Alta California
 1848 – Treaty of Guadalupe Hidalgo – fully ends the Mexican–American War; sets the Rio Grande as the boundary between Mexico and Texas and cedes much of northern Mexico to the United States.
 1849 – Hawaiian–American Treaty of Friendship, Commerce and Navigation – Treaty between the Hawaiian Kingdom and the United States

1850–1899
 1850 – Clayton–Bulwer Treaty – U.S. and United Kingdom agree not to colonize Central America
 1851 – Treaty of Fort Laramie (1851) – with the Cheyenne, Sioux, Arapaho, Crow, Assiniboine, Mandan, Hidatsa, and Arikara Nations
 1851 – California Indian Reservations and Cessions – 18 lost treaties of California 
 1854 – Convention of Kanagawa – forcibly opens Japan to American trade
 1855 – Canadian–American Reciprocity Treaty – with Canada on trade and tariffs
 1855 - Treaty of Point Elliot (1855) - Dwamish, Suquamish, Sk-kahl-mish, Sam-ahmish, Smalh-kamish, Skope-ahmish, St-kah-mish, Snoqualmoo, Skai-wha-mish, N'Quentl-ma-mish, Sk-tah-le-jum, Stoluck-wha-mish, Sno-ho-mish, Skagit, Kik-i-allus, Swin-a-mish, Squin-ah-mish, Sah-ku-mehu, Noo-wha-ha, Nook-wa-chah-mish, Mee-see-qua-guilch, Cho-bah-ah-bish, and other allied and subordinate tribes and bands. 
 1855 – Treaty of Detroit (1855) – U. S. and Ottawa and Chippewa Nations of Indians which severed the link between the two Native American groups for further treaty negotiations and prepared the way for allotment of tribal land to individuals.
 1857 – American treaty is kept with France- Treaty between American and Russia
 1858 – Treaty of Amity and Commerce (United States–Japan), also known as Harris Treaty – forces the opening of treaty ports on Japan
 1858 – Treaty of Tientsin – with China after the Second Opium War; established peace, amity, and commerce
 1862 – Ottoman-American Treaty of Commerce and Navigation
 1864 – First Geneva Convention – established rules for the treatment of battlefield casualties and sick and wounded combatants
 1867 – Alaska Purchase – U.S. buys Alaska from Russia
 1868 – Burlingame Treaty – with China; established improved relations
 1868 – Naturalization Convention – with North German Confederation; first recognition by a European power of the legal right of its subjects to become American citizens
 1868 – Naturalization Convention – with Belgium
 1868 – Treaty of Bosque Redondo – With the Navajo ending the Navajo Wars
 1868 – Treaty of Fort Laramie – with the Sioux and Arapaho ending Red Cloud's War.
 1869 – Naturalization Convention – with Sweden and Norway.
 1870 – Naturalization Convention – with United Kingdom
 1871 – Treaty of Washington – settles grievances between the U.S. and Canada including the Alabama Claims
 1872 – Naturalization Convention – with Denmark
 1883 – Paris Convention for the Protection of Industrial Property – intellectual property systems, including patents, of any contracting state become accessible to the nationals of other states party to the Convention
 1886 – Berne Convention for the Protection of Literary and Artistic Works (ratified by U.S. in 1989)
 1898 – Sixth Treaty of Paris – ends the Spanish–American War
 1899 – Hague Conventions – one of the first formal statements of the laws of war

1900–1949
 1900 – Treaty between Spain and the United States for Cession of Outlying Islands of the Philippines. Concluded November 7, 1900; ratification advised by Senate January 22, 1901 .. ratified by the President January 30, 1901; ratifications exchanged March 23, 1901; proclaimed March 23, 1901.
 1901 – Hay–Pauncefote Treaty – nullified Clayton–Bulwer Treaty in exchange for free access to build a canal across Central America
 1901 – Boxer Protocol AKA Treaty of 1901, Peace Agreement between the Great Powers and China – one of the Unequal Treaties with China
 1902 – Naturalization Convention – with Haiti
 1903 – Hay–Herrán Treaty – the U.S. attempt to acquire a lease on Panama from Colombia (not ratified by Colombia)
 1903 – Hay–Bunau-Varilla Treaty – establishes the Panama Canal Zone
 1903 – Cuban–American Treaty of Relations (1903) – completed lease on
 1905 – Treaty of Portsmouth – ends Russo-Japanese War; negotiated by President Theodore Roosevelt
 1905 – Taft–Katsura Agreement – Japan and U.S. agree on spheres of influence in Asia
 1906 – Second Geneva Convention – treatment of wounded, sick and shipwrecked members of armed forces at sea
 1906 – Inter-American Convention Establishing the Status of Naturalized Citizens Who Again Take Up Residence in the Country of Their Origin
 1907 – Gentlemen's Agreement – limiting Japanese immigration to the U.S.
 1907 – Naturalization Convention – with Peru
 1908 – Naturalization Convention – with Portugal
 1908 – Naturalization Convention – with El Salvador
 1908 – Naturalization Convention – with Honduras
 1908 – Naturalization Convention – with Nicaragua
 1908 – Naturalization Convention – with Uruguay
 1909 – Boundary Waters Treaty – regulates water quantity and water quality along the boundary between Canada and the United States.
 1911 – Naturalization Convention – with Costa Rica
 1911 – North Pacific Fur Seal Convention of 1911 – first international treaty for wildlife preservation
 1912 – International Opium Convention – first international drug control treaty
 1916 – Treaty of the Danish West Indies – U.S. purchase of the Danish West Indies, renaming them the United States Virgin Islands
 1917 – Lansing–Ishii Agreement – trade treaty between the U.S. and Japan
 1918 – Migratory Bird Treaty – Environment treaty with the United Kingdom representing Canada, to protect birds which migrate between Canada and the U.S.
 1919 – Treaty of Versailles, 1919 – ended the state of war between Germany and the Allied Powers and established the League of Nations. Ultimately not ratified by the U.S. Senate. 
 1920 – Svalbard Treaty – recognizes Norwegian sovereignty over Svalbard and regulates its open access, economic activities, environmental protection, taxation and demilitarization
 1921 – U.S.–Austrian Peace Treaty (1921) – separate World War I peace agreement between United States and Austria
 1921 – Treaty of Berlin – separate World War I peace agreement between United States and Germany
 1921 – U.S.–Hungarian Peace Treaty (1921) – separate World War I peace agreement between United States and Hungary
 1922 – Washington Naval Treaty – limits the naval armaments race, supplement to restrict submarine warfare and ban chemical warfare was rejected by France.
 1923 – Treaty of Lausanne – sets the boundaries of the modern Republic of Turkey
 1925 – Anglo-American Convention – American acceptance of the provisions of the Mandate for Palestine and supervision of British performance as mandatory of the Mandate for Palestine.
 1925 – Hay-Quesada Treaty – America accepts Cuban ownership of Isle of Pines.
 1928 – Kellogg–Briand Pact – calls "for the renunciation of war as an instrument of national policy"
 1929 – Geneva Convention on Prisoners of War – establishes rules for the treatment of prisoners of war
 1930 – London Naval Treaty – regulates submarine warfare and shipbuilding
 1930 – Convention Between the United States and Great Britain – Definitely delimits the boundary between North Borneo (then a British protectorate) and the Philippine archipelago (then a U.S. Territory)
 1934 – Treaty of Relations – agreements between United States and Cuba s:United States – Cuban Agreements and Treaty of 1934
 1937 – Treaty Defining Liability for Military Service, etc. – with Lithuania
 1943 – Sino-American Treaty for the Relinquishment of Extraterritorial Rights in China – relinquished previous U.S. rights to extraterritoriality in China
 1944 – Bretton Woods Agreement – establishes the rules for commercial and financial relations among the major industrial states
 1945 – UN Charter – establishes the United Nations
 1946 – Bermuda Agreement – bilateral treaty on Civil Aviation between U.S. and United Kingdom
 1946 – Treaty of Manila (1946) – United States recognizes independence of the Republic of the Philippines
 1947 – General Agreement on Tariffs and Trade (GATT) – establishes rules for international trade
 1947 – Paris Peace Treaties, 1947 – establishes peace in Europe after World War II.
 1947 – Inter-American Treaty of Reciprocal Assistance (Rio Treaty) – Western Hemisphere mutual defense
 1947 – Convention on International Civil Aviation AKA Chicago Convention – establishes International Civil Aviation Organization (ICAO)
 1949 – North Atlantic Treaty (Treaty of Washington) – establishes NATO mutual defense organization
 1949 – Fourth Geneva Convention – establishes rules for the protection of civilians during times of war
 1949 – Treaty of Friendship, Commerce and Navigation between the United States of America and the Republic of China – establishes amiable relations between the U.S. and China.

1950–1999
 1951 – Convention on the Prevention and Punishment of the Crime of Genocide – (with U.S. qualifications)
 1951 – Treaty of San Francisco – a peace treaty between the Allied Powers and Japan; ends the Pacific conflict of World War II
 1951 – Mutual Defense Treaty – alliance between the Republic of the Philippines and the United States of America
 1951 – Treaty of Security between the United States and Japan (updated 1960) 
 1952 – ANZUS Treaty – mutual defense alliance between Australia, New Zealand, and the United States
 1953 – Mutual Defense Treaty – Created an alliance with South Korea, and established the basis of South Korean adherence with U.S. government consultations on North Korean policy
 1954 – U.S. and Japan Mutual Defense Assistance Agreement 
 1954 – Southeast Asia Collective Defense Treaty – creates SEATO mutual defense organization
 1954 – Sino-American Mutual Defense Treaty – alliance between the United States and Taiwan
 1955 – Central Treaty Organization AKA CENTO, the Middle East Treaty Organization (METO), Baghdad Pact – creates CENTO mutual defense organization
 1955 – The Open Skies Treaty – allow access to other nations' military activities by means of aerial surveillance flights
 1955 – Treaty of Amity, Economic Relations and Consular Rights (United States–Iran) – provided friendly diplomatic relations between the United States and Pahlavi Iran. 
 1956 – Dutch–American Friendship Treaty
 1957 – International Atomic Energy Treaty (US PL 85–177)
 1958 – 1958 US-UK Mutual Defence Agreement – commenced the "Special Relationship" with the United Kingdom
 1960 – Treaty of Mutual Cooperation and Security between the United States and Japan – mutual defense treaty with Japan
 1961 – Arms Control and Disarmament Agency (US PL 87-297)
 1961 – Antarctic Treaty – governs international relations in Antarctica
 1961 – Columbia River Treaty (ratified in 1964) – with Canada to manage water in the Columbia River valley
 1961 – Vienna Convention on Diplomatic Relations – specifies diplomatic immunity
 1961 – Alliance for Progress – economic cooperation treaty with Latin America
 1961 – Single Convention on Narcotic Drugs
 1962 – Nassau Agreement – defense treaty with United Kingdom
1962 – Joint Declaration on Commercial Relations (with the European Economic Community, signed March 7, 1962)
 1963 – Vienna Convention on Consular Relations – treaty on consular protocol
 1963 – Vienna Convention on Civil Liability for Nuclear Damage – provides liability in the case of a nuclear accident
 1963 – Partial Nuclear Test Ban Treaty – Prohibited nuclear weapons testing except for underground tests.
 1966 – Treaty of Amity and Economic Relations (Thailand–United States) – commercial treaty with the Kingdom of Thailand
 1966 – International Convention on the Elimination of All Forms of Racial Discrimination – treaty prohibiting racial discrimination.
 1967 – Outer Space Treaty – Basis for space law. Prohibits use of weapons of mass destruction, including nuclear weapons, in space
 1968 – Nuclear Non-Proliferation Treaty – Prohibits signatories from acquiring nuclear weapons and commits nuclear-armed states to nuclear disarmament.
 1968 – Protocol Relating to the Status of Refugees
 1969 – Vienna Convention on the Law of Treaties – provides rules on making international treaties. The United States is not a party to this treaty.
 1970 – Patent Cooperation Treaty (PCT) – Provides unified procedure on patent applications
 1970 – Boundary Treaty of 1970 – settles U.S. – Mexico border on Rio Grande
 1971 – Geneva Phonograms Convention – provides copyright protections for audio recordings
 1971 – Convention on Psychotropic Substances – restricts the import and export of psychotropic drugs.
 1972 – Anti-Ballistic Missile Treaty AKA ABM Treaty (U.S. withdrew in 2002) – limited anti-ballistic missiles
 1972 – SALT I (Strategic Arms Limitation Treaty) – provided limitations on new intercontinental ballistic missile launchers and submarine-launched ballistic missiles
 1972 – Biological Weapons Convention – prohibited production of biological weapons
 1972 – Convention on the Prevention of Marine Pollution by Dumping of Wastes and Other Matter (London Convention) (implemented by U.S., but not signed) – regulates waste disposal from vessels at sea
 1972 – Great Lakes Water Quality Agreement – regulates water quality along the U.S.-Canada border
 1973 – Paris Peace Accords – with North Vietnam ending the Vietnam War
 1974 – Threshold Test Ban Treaty – limited nuclear testing to 150 kilotons per year
 1977 – Torrijos-Carter Treaties – transfer of Panama Canal to Panama
 1978 – Camp David Accords – peace treaty between Israel and Egypt; negotiated and signed in U.S.
 1978 – Great Lakes Water Quality Agreement (1978) – regulates water quality along the U.S.-Canada border
1978 - Treaty on maritime boundaries between the United Mexican States and the United States of America
 1979 – SALT II (not ratified by U.S.) – sought to limit production of strategic nuclear weapons
 1979 – Treaty of Tarawa – recognizes sovereignty of Kiribati over disputed islands
 1980 – Cook Islands–United States Maritime Boundary Treaty – settles disputed claims and establishes the maritime boundary between American Samoa and the Cook Islands
 1980 – Treaty of Tokehega – settles disputed claims and establishes the maritime boundary between American Samoa and Tokelau
 1985 – Plaza Accord – G-5 agreed to devalue the U.S. dollar in relation to the Japanese yen and German Deutsche Mark by intervening in currency markets
 1986 – Vienna Convention on the Law of Treaties between States and International Organizations or Between International Organizations 
 1986 – United Nations Convention on Contracts for the International Sale of Goods – regulates contracts on international trade
 1988 – Intermediate-Range Nuclear Forces Treaty (INF) – dismantled all short-range and intermediate-range ballistic missiles of the United States and the Soviet Union. 
 1988 – United Nations Convention Against Illicit Traffic in Narcotic Drugs and Psychotropic Substances – provides legal mechanisms on enforcement of previous narcotics treaties
 1988 – United Nations Convention Against Torture – prohibited use of torture and cruel and unusual punishment
 1989 – Montreal Protocol on Substances That Deplete the Ozone Layer
 1990 – Treaty on the Final Settlement with Respect to Germany – final World War II peace with Germany and Allies
 1991 – Treaty on Conventional Armed Forces in Europe – Signed by all 16 NATO members and Warsaw Pact nations; ratified by all 16 NATO states, the eight successor states to the USSR that have territory in Europe, and the six former Warsaw Pact nations
 1991 – START I (Strategic Arms Reduction Treaty) – limited amounts of nuclear warheads, ballistic missiles, and strategic bombers between the United States and the Soviet Union
 1992 – International Covenant on Civil and Political Rights (ratified with qualifications by U.S. Senate) – commits signatories to respect civil and political rights
 1992 – United Nations Framework Convention on Climate Change – limited carbon emissions
 1993 – Oslo Accords – between the Palestine Liberation Organization and Israel; negotiated with U.S. involvement
 1993 – Chemical Weapons Convention – prohibits chemical weapons
 1993 – START II (ratified by U.S. and Russia) – prohibited intercontinental ballistic missiles with multiple independently targetable reentry vehicles
 1994 – North American Free Trade Agreement (NAFTA) – removed tariffs and trade barriers between the United States, Mexico, and Canada
 1994 – Convention on the Limitation Period in the International Sale of Goods – regulated contracts on sales of goods
 1994 – Kremlin accords – US and USSR missile and nuclear weapons control; ended preprogrammed targeting of strategic nuclear missiles
 1994 – United Nations Convention on the Law of the Sea AKA Law of the Sea, LOS (not ratified by U.S.)
 1994 – Colorado river dispute – with Mexico on water quality and quantity
 1995 – Dayton Agreement – ended the Bosnian War and determines the future of Bosnia and Herzegovina; negotiated and signed in U.S.
 1995 – General Agreement on Trade in Services (GATS) – extended multilateral trade to the service sector
 1996 – WIPO Copyright Treaty – protects computer programs and databases
 1996 – WIPO Performances and Phonograms Treaty
 1996 – Comprehensive Nuclear-Test-Ban Treaty (signed but not ratified by U.S.) – completely prohibits nuclear weapon testing
 1997 – Worldwide Chemical Weapons Convention – 
 1998 – Rome Statute of the International Criminal Court ("unsigned" by the U.S.) – established the International Criminal Court

2000–current
 2000 – Patents Law Treaty (PLT) – (not ratified by U.S.)
 2001 – Convention on Cybercrime – a highly controversial proposal (U.S. Senate ratified August 2006)
2001 – Bonn Agreement – provided plans for the reconstruction of Afghanistan after the U.S. invasion.
 2002 – SORT (Strategic Offensive Reductions Treaty) AKA Moscow Treaty – limits the nuclear arsenals of Russia and the U.S.
 2004 – International Treaty on Plant Genetic Resources for Food and Agriculture AKA "International Seed Treaty" – to assure farmers' access to seeds of the world's food security crops
 2005 – Dominican Republic-Central America Free Trade Agreement
2008 – U.S.–Iraq Status of Forces Agreement – agreed to withdraw U.S. military forces from Iraq by 2011. 
 2010 – New START (The New Strategic Arms Reduction Treaty) U.S./Russia Treaty – limits the nuclear arsenal capabilities of Russia and the U.S. while allowing for inspection.
 2012 – United States–Korea Free Trade Agreement (KORUS FTA)
 2013 – UN Arms Treaty (U.S./U.N. Treaty) – regulates the international arms trade (signed but not ratified by U.S.)
2013 – U.S.–Afghanistan Strategic Partnership Agreement – regulates Afghanistan–United States relations and provided agreement for withdrawal of U.S. forces from the War in Afghanistan.
2015 – Paris Agreement – climate change mitigation treaty aiming to keep global temperatures from rising 2 °C above pre-industrial levels (not ratified by U.S.)
2015 – Joint Comprehensive Plan of Action – regulated the Iranian nuclear program to prevent nuclear weapons development.
2020 – United States–Mexico–Canada Agreement – trade agreement designed to replace NAFTA
2022 – Kigali Amendment to the Montreal Protocol, regulating hydrofluorocarbons (HFCs)

U.S.–Native American treaties

From 1778 to 1871, the United States government entered into more than 500 treaties with the Native American tribes; all of these treaties have since been violated in some way or outright broken by the U.S. government, with Native Americans and First Nations peoples still fighting for their treaty rights in federal courts and at the United Nations.

In addition to treaties, which are ratified by the U.S. Senate and signed by the U.S. President, there were also Acts of Congress and Executive Orders which dealt with land agreements. The U.S. military and representatives of a tribe, or sub unit of a tribe, signed documents which were understood at the time to be treaties, rather than armistices, ceasefires and truces.

The entries from 1784 to 1895 were initially created by information gathered by Charles C. Royce and published in the U.S. Serial Set, Number 4015, 56th Congress, 1st Session, in 1899. The purpose of the Schedule of Indian Land Cessions was to indicate the location of each cession by or reservation for the Indian Tribes. Royce's column headings are titled: "Date, Where or how concluded, Reference, Tribe, Description of cession or reservation, historical data and remarks, Designation of cession on map, Number, Location".

The Ratified Indian Treaties that were transferred from the U.S. State Department to the National Archives were recently conserved and imaged for the first time, and in 2020 made available online with additional context at the Indigenous Digital Archive's Treaties Explorer, or DigiTreaties.org.

1778–1799

1800–1809

1810–1819

1820–1829

1830–1839

1840–1849

1850–1859

1860–1869

1870–1879

Treaty-making between various Native American governments and the United States officially concluded on March 3, 1871 with the passing of the United States Code Title 25, Chapter 3, Subchapter 1, Section 71. Pre-existing treaties were grandfathered, and further agreements were made under domestic law.

1880–present

See also
 List of treaties
 List of treaties of the Confederate States of America
 List of treaties unsigned or unratified by the United States

Notes and references

External links
Treaties in Force, United States Department of State
List of documents relating to the negotiation of ratified and unratified treaties with various Indian Tribes, 1801–1869 (1949) from the University of Wisconsin Digital Collections
 Native American Treaties and Information from UCB Libraries GovPubs
List of Treaties between the U.S. and Foreign Nations 1778–1845 from the Library of Congress
List of Treaties between the U.S. and Indian Tribes 1778–1842 from the Library of Congress
List of Treaties 1845–1851 from the Library of Congress
List of Treaties 1851–1855 from the Library of Congress
List of Treaties 1855–1859 from the Library of Congress
Indian Land Cessions in the U.S., 1784 to 1894: List of Dates
United States Treaties and International Agreements: 1776–1949

Lists of treaties